Gunnar Konsmo (13 June 1922 – 10 April 1996) was a Norwegian speed skater who competed in the 1948 Winter Olympics. In 1948 he finished tenth in the 1500 metres competition.

References

External links
 
 Speed skating 1948 

1922 births
1996 deaths
Norwegian male speed skaters
Olympic speed skaters of Norway
Speed skaters at the 1948 Winter Olympics